Argentina competed at the Winter Olympic Games for the first time at the 1928 Winter Olympics in St. Moritz, Switzerland.  The nation sent two bobsleigh teams, which finished in fourth and fifth place in the event. This participation is the best performance in the Winter Olympics of Argentina and any other Latin American nation.

Bobsleigh

References

 

Nations at the 1928 Winter Olympics
1928
Olympics, Winter